1997–98 Amateur championship of Ukraine was the sixth amateur championship of Ukraine and the 34th since the establishment of championship among fitness clubs (KFK) in 1964. 

Due to the mass withdrawal of teams during the last season, number of groups was reduced to four.

Teams

Location map

First stage

Group 1

Group 2

Group 3

Group 4

Finals
The second stage was finals that took place in Burshtyn, Ivano-Frankivsk Oblast.

Group A

Group B

Championship play-offs
1st place

3rd place

5th place

Promotion play-off

Promotions
For the 1998–99 Ukrainian Second League were promoted FC Enerhetyk Burshtyn (champion), FC Dalis Komyshuvakha (runner-up), FC Shakhtar Horlivka (play-off winner). Before the start of next season Dalis Komyshuvakha withdrew. 

Besides the Amateur League's teams to the Second League also were admitted some other teams.

External links
 Information on the competition

Ukrainian Football Amateur League seasons
4
Ukra